Ramesh Korgaonkar  is Shiv Sena politician from Mumbai, Maharashtra. He is MLA in Maharashtra Legislative Assembly from Bhandup West Vidhan Sabha constituency as a member of Shiv Sena.

Positions held
 2002: Elected as corporator in Brihanmumbai Municipal Corporation (BMC) (1st term)
 2007: Re-elected as corporator in Brihanmumbai Municipal Corporation (2nd term) 
 2012: Re-elected as corporator in Brihanmumbai Municipal Corporation (3rd term) 
 2012:  Elected as Chairman of Civil Works (suburbs) Committee Brihanmumbai Municipal Corporation 
 2017: Re-elected as corporator in Brihanmumbai Municipal Corporation (4th term) 
 2017: Elected as Standing Committee Chairman Brihanmumbai Municipal Corporation 
 2019: Elected to Maharashtra Legislative Assembly

References

External links
  Shivsena Home Page 

Living people
Marathi politicians
Shiv Sena politicians
21st-century Indian politicians
Maharashtra municipal councillors
Politicians from Mumbai
Year of birth missing (living people)